The Philadelphia Liberty Belles are a team of the Women's Football Alliance which began play for its inaugural 2009 season.  Home games are played on the campus of Wissahickon High School in Ambler, Pennsylvania.

The Liberty Belles are named in honor of a team which played in the National Women's Football Association and Independent Women's Football League from 2001 to 2004 (and in fact, won the NWFA's inaugural 2001 championship). Despite the namesake, there is no connection between the two teams and only one person related to this team from the original (Carol Grubb).

Season-By-Season

|-
|2009 || 8 || 0 || 0 || 1st National Northeast || Won National Conference Semifinal (Indiana)Lost National Conference Championship (West Michigan)
|-
|2010 || 8 || 0 || 0 || 1st National Northeast|| Won National Conference Quarterfinal (West Michigan)Lost National Conference Semifinal (Columbus)
|-
|2011 || 2 || 6 || 0 || 3rd National Northeast || --
|-
|2012* || 1 || 2 || 0 || 3rd National Division 2 || --
|-
!Totals || 21 || 10 || 0
|colspan="2"| (including playoffs)

* = current standing

Roster

2009

Season schedule

2010

Season schedule

2011

Standings

Season schedule

2012

Standings

Season schedule

External links
Philadelphia Liberty Belles official website

Women's Football Alliance teams
American football teams in Philadelphia
American football teams established in 2009
Women's sports in Pennsylvania